The Samsung Galaxy A8 (stylized as Samsung GALAXY A8) is an Android phablet produced by Samsung Electronics.  It was introduced on July 15, 2015.

Specifications
The display is protected by Gorilla Glass 4.

Other specifications include a 5.7 inch 1080p (1080x1920) Super AMOLED display, touch based fingerprint sensor integrated to the home button, 16 MP back camera and 5 MP front camera.

It is powered by Exynos 5430, Exynos 5433 or Snapdragon 615. All of these SoCs feature an octa core processor and they are backed by 2 GB RAM and 32 GB internal storage. There is a hybrid SIM slot that can also be used as a microSD card slot. It has a 3050 mAh non-removable battery. 

It is shipped with Android 5.1.1 Lollipop. 

The Japan KDDI variant includes Oneseg & full Seg TV features while the Korean SK Telecom Variant has a T-DMB feature.

References

Android (operating system) devices
Mobile phones introduced in 2015
Samsung smartphones
Samsung Galaxy